The County class was a class of heavy cruisers built for the Royal Navy in the years between the First and Second World Wars. They were the first post-war cruisers constructed for the Royal Navy and were designed within the limits of the Washington Naval Treaty of 1922. Such ships, with a limit of 10,000 tons, standard displacement and 8-inch calibre main guns may be referred to as "treaty cruisers" (the term "heavy cruiser" was not defined until the London Naval Treaty of 1930).

The thirteen Counties were built in the Kent, London and Norfolk sub-classes. They were the only 10,000-ton 8-inch gun, or "A", cruisers that the Royal Navy built. The Counties are remembered for their distinctive three-funnel layout and service in all the major naval theatres of the Second World War.

To extract more ships from the treaty limits, the navy planned to construct 8,250-ton "B" ships, six of which could be built in place of five Counties. The extra ship that this afforded was an attractive proposition for a navy that had the immense peacetime commitments of empire.

In 1929, the mean cost of each "A" ship was estimated to be £2,180,000, whilst the mean cost of each "B" ship was estimated to be £1,800,000.

Design and development
The 10,000-ton treaty cruisers were the first type of warships built to internationally agreed restrictions. These restrictions posed new engineering challenges and forced compromises upon designers in how to extract the best balance of speed, armament and protection. The United States Navy adopted a design with triple-gun turrets, allowing the hull to be shortened thus saving weight that could be put into protection. This approach required increased power, as the speed of a ship is a function of the ratio of length to beam. The Royal Navy had a requirement for a vessel for colonial trade route defence, which required a good cruising range and speed and independent fighting power. This determined the need for a long hull and the use of four twin-gun turrets, with any remaining displacement invested in protection.

The design was conservative in nature, especially when compared to the contemporary Nelson-class battleships built to satisfy the same treaty. The long (630 feet overall) hull was flush decked and with a high freeboard and was strongly built. This afforded high initial stability, which contributed to the protection scheme. The machinery spaces followed the traditional layout of boiler rooms ahead of engine rooms, separated by an amidships magazine. The two boiler rooms exhausted into four uptakes, the central pair being combined to form a thickened central funnel. The three-funnel design was handsome but a somewhat impractical use of internal space.

As had been tested in the First World War Emerald class cruiser , whose completion had been delayed post-war, the Counties featured a new design of forward superstructure incorporating the navigating bridge, wheelhouse, signalling and compass platforms and gunnery director in a block. This advance considerably rationalised the separate armoured conning tower and myriad of decks and platforms of older designs. Moving the fire-control equipment from the mast negated the need for a heavy tripod and light pole masts sufficed for signalling yards and the spread of wireless antennae.

Armament
The guns, BL 8-inch Mark VIII (203 mm, L/50), were equally disposed in superfiring twin turrets fore and aft. The turret design was needlessly complicated by the original requirement that they should be capable of anti-aircraft fire and were thus provided with a maximum elevation of 70°, despite the inability to train and elevate sufficiently quickly to track aerial targets and the complete lack of a suitable fire control system.

Secondary armament consisted of four QF  (L/45) Mark V guns in single mounts HA Mk.III fed from the amidships magazine. There were quadruple-tube torpedo launchers, one each side, amidships. The single 4-inch Mk V guns were later replaced by Mk XVI guns in paired mountings. In a fruitless attempt to keep within treaty limits, the Mark XVI mounting was stripped down to reduce the weight, the result being the Mark XVII, an exercise described as "ridiculous punctiliousness". They were later converted back to standard Mark XVI mounts. The initial design called for two octuple mountings for the QF 2-pounder Mk.VIII anti-aircraft autocannon but as a weight-saving exercise these were not initially shipped and the existing QF 2-pounder Mark II was carried in lieu on four single mounts. Space was provided for a rotating catapult and a crane for operating aircraft, although again these were initially not provided.

Protection
The initial design left little weight to distribute amongst protection. Thus, the traditional side-belt of armour was dispensed with and the  side plating was sufficient to only give protection against shell splinters. A  protective deck covered the machinery spaces and there were "box citadels" protecting the magazines and shell rooms;  crowns and  sides, closed by 2.5-inch bulkheads. The aft box citadel had slightly reduced thicknesses at the ends and the citadel amidships had thinner armour as it lay within the confines of the armoured deck and side plating. There was a  arch over the steering gear closed by a 1-inch-thick forward bulkhead. The turrets and barbettes received only thin splinter plating, as did the compass platform. There were external bulges to provide torpedo protection.

Differences and modifications

Kent class
Originally planned as a programme of 17 Royal Navy vessels, the numbers were cut back significantly following the formation of the first Labour Government after the election of December 1923. Of the eight ships planned to begin construction in 1924, only five were approved, with a further two ordered later by the Royal Australian Navy.

All were ordered in 1924 and commissioned in 1928. The Australian ships, Australia and Canberra had them raised a further . Between 1930 and 1933 the aircraft and catapult were added, as was a high-angle HACS director for the 4-inch guns. Kent received an additional pair of 4-inch guns in 1934, and she, Berwick and Cornwall each received a pair of QF 0.5-inch Vickers machine guns added abreast the fore funnel.

By the mid-1930s, the British Kents were due for modernisation. However, there was little surplus weight for the designers to work with while remaining within the Treaty requirements; they were between 150 and 250 tons under the treaty limits and it was estimated that a further 200-odd tons could be gained through various savings. Cumberland and Suffolk had the aft superstructure razed and replaced by a large hangar for two aircraft and a fixed athwartships catapult. A crane was fitted on either side of the after funnel, and the rear gunnery, navigation and control positions were relocated to the hangar roof. The single 2-pounder guns were removed, and quadruple mountings, Mark VII, were added on either side of the bridge. The 4-inch guns were relocated, and the rearmost pair were replaced by twin mountings Mark XIX for the QF 4-inch Mark XVI. To keep weight within acceptable margins, the hull was cut down by one deck aft of "Y" turret. Berwick and Cornwall were similarly converted, but with more weight in hand the hull was not cut down; all four 4-inch mounts were twins and the 2-pounder guns were octuple mounts. By 1939, the torpedo tubes had been removed in all four ships.

Kent had less weight available for improvements and therefore was not given such an extensive modernisation. While she received the 4-inch armour belt and the double 4-inch gun mounts like her sisters, she retained the rotating catapult and after superstructure, with an additional fire-control position mounted on a distinctive lattice structure aft. Her anti-aircraft armaments were improved as for her sisters, but the multiple 2-pounders and their directors were carried aft, by the lattice structure. The naval historian H. Trevor Lenton estimates that despite the best attempts, none of these ships stayed within the treaty limits; Kents full load displacement was 14,197 tons, indicating a standard displacement of around 10,600 tons. Lenton expresses doubts whether the Admiralty ever informed the Government of these excesses, as with war imminent, "there were more pressing demands on their time". Another historian, Leo Marriott, gives an alternative displacement of 10,300 tons and notes that it was "unofficially accepted" by the UK, USA, Italy, France and Japan that refits could allow ships to exceed the London treaty limits by up to 300 tons.

London class
The second group, the four ships of the London class (and ), closely followed the design of the Kents. To remedy the loss of the bulge protection, there was a second skin of inner plating to provide the same effect. The bridge was moved aft to lessen the effects of muzzle blast from B turret when the guns were trained abaft the beam. They had heightened funnels as built. The aircraft and catapult had been fitted by 1932.

In all ships but Sussex, four 4-inch guns were added in single mountings abreast the funnels. The single 2-pounder guns were removed, and two quadruple mounts for 0.5-inch Vickers machine guns were added. Shropshire acquired an additional anti-aircraft fire control director. Early in the war, the additional 4-inch guns were removed, and the original 4-inch guns altered to the Mark XVI twin mounts. The octuple 2-pounder guns that had originally been designed in were also finally added.

From 1938 to 1941, London received an altogether more comprehensive modernisation. Her upperworks were removed and replaced by new fore and aft superstructures and two upright funnels modelled on the contemporary  cruisers. The forward superstructure block incorporated a large hangar opening onto an athwartships catapult between the superstructure blocks. There was a catapult on either side of the after funnel. The 4-inch anti-aircraft guns were replaced by twin mountings and relocated to the after superstructure, with the torpedoes a deck below. The 2-pounder guns were carried on the hangar roof and the multiple Vickers guns mounted, one each, on the roofs of "B" and "X" turrets. However, the hull had originally been carefully designed to reduce weight based on the initial arrangements. The modifications to London added heavy weights fore and aft and severely overstressed the hull. As a result cracks and loose rivets began to appear on the upper deck. The upper deck was reinforced, which caused the stress to be transmitted through the lower hull instead and cracks began to appear under the waterline. It took underwater reinforcements and refits extending into 1943 to remedy the situation.

The outbreak of war prevented what had ended up being a rather fruitless cosmetic rebuild being extended to the rest of her sisters, as had originally been intended. The remaining Londons thus never received side armouring or the improved aircraft complement.

During wartime refits, the last three Londons underwent similar alterations as the Kents did, having their eight  torpedo tubes removed, and "X"  turret removed, although both London and Shropshire retained it. Shropshire, unlike her two un-converted sisters retained her torpedo armament, and was transferred to the Royal Australian Navy in early 1943 to replace Canberra.

Norfolk class
The final pair of Counties –  and  – formed the Norfolk class. Another two ships that had been deferred from the 1927–1928 and 1928–1929 programmes – to have been named Northumberland and Surrey – were ordered on 15 May 1929, but suspended on 23 August and finally cancelled on 14 January 1930. A proposed fifth vessel of the sub-class was also cancelled. This was due to the change in administration in 1929 that ushered in a minority Labour government under Ramsay MacDonald. The new government cancelled the ships as an economy measure and as a gesture to the forthcoming London Naval Conference 1930.

The Norfolks were repeats of the Londons with minor alterations. The bridge and after superstructure were lowered. The 8-inch gun mountings were Mark II variants that simplified loading but ended up being heavier than the Mark I variant. The 4-inch guns were relocated forwards in order that they did not obstruct the catapult and aircraft which had been mounted lower down than in their predecessors. During 1937, the 4-inch guns were replaced by twins, octuple 2-pounders were added around the after superstructure and the single guns forward were removed. These improvements pushed the standard displacement over 10,400 tons.

During the war, UP rocket launchers were initially added, but they were later removed along with the Vickers guns. These were replaced by the altogether more useful 20 mm Oerlikon gun. An additional director for the 4-inch guns was added, and the pole masts were replaced by tripods to support the additional weight of masthead electronics. Dorsetshire was sunk in 1942, and so it was only Norfolk that underwent a refit in 1944, during which her aircraft, catapult and X turret were removed. This allowed four quadruple 2-pounder mounts and their directors and four single 40 mm Bofors guns to be added. An extra superstructure was added aft to carry barrage directors, fitted with radar Type 283, which finally allowed the main armament to serve in its intended anti-aircraft role.

It was intended for Surrey and Northumberland to have a modified design, more heavily armoured but  slower.

Comparison of classes

Ships

Service

The County class saw much service during the Second World War.

The class saw service in nearly every theatre of the war. Suffolk and Sussex suffered bomb damage from Luftwaffe aircraft, and both required substantial repairs. Three of the class were lost, with Canberra being hit by naval gunfire at the Battle of Savo Island then scuttled by a U.S. destroyer, and Cornwall and Dorsetshire both bombed and sunk by Japanese carrier-borne aircraft during the Indian Ocean raid.

She was scrapped in 1959.

Canarias class

Completed in the late 1930s for the Spanish Navy, they saw service during the Spanish Civil War. Although they shared a common hull, machinery and main armament, the Spanish ships had a notably different appearance, with an enormous single funnel – though Canarias received two funnels in a later refit – and an equally tall forward superstructure.

References

Bibliography

External links

Cruiser classes
 
Ship classes of the Royal Navy